Events from the year 1400 in the Kingdom of Scotland.

Incumbents
Monarch – Robert III

Events
 August - English invasion of Scotland - mid-August, Henry IV of England crosses border with army, however returned to England on 29 August.

See also

 Timeline of Scottish history

References

 
Years of the 14th century in Scotland